Dr Eileen Joyce Harris (born 1932) is an American/English architectural historian and author. She is an expert on Robert Adam and is Honorary Librarian and Consultant to the Adam Project at Sir John Soane's Museum in London.

Early and family life
Eileen Joyce Harris is American and married to Englishman John Harris, has a son, Lucian Guthrie, and a daughter, Georgina, and lives in London and Badminton, Gloucestershire, UK. Eileen Harris (née Spiegel) was born in November 1932 to Paul Spiegel (20 June 1904 - 15 June 1991) and Irene Stein (14 September 1900, Russia - 25 December 1991) in the city of Brooklyn, New York. Eileen also has a younger brother, Michael Ivan Spiegel (25 December 1934, Brooklyn, New York - 3 August 2012, San Francisco, California), who was a famous antitrust lawyer and also Deputy Attorney General of California for 25 years.

Career
Harris is an internationally recognised Robert Adam scholar, publishing extensively on the subject for over 40 years. Harris, along with Nicholas Savage (of the Royal Academy Library), has been working part-time on an integrated catalogue of Sir John Soane's art, architectural and general volumes and pamphlets in his library at Sir John Soane's Museum, being made available online.

Books (in reverse chronology)
The Country Houses of Robert Adam (2007) From the Archives of Country Life, Aurum Press Ltd, .
The Genius of Robert Adam: His Interiors (2001) Paul Mellon Centre for Studies, Yale University Press, . Selected by Choice as a 2003 Outstanding Academic Title. Selected by Architects Journal as one of the Books of the Year (2001).
Osterley Park, Middlesex (1994) National Trust Guide Books, .
Architectural Books in Britain, 1556-1785: An Historical and Bibliographical Account (1990) Rizzoli Intl Pubns, .
Arbours & Grottos. A Facsimile of the Two Parts of Universal Architecture, 1755 and 1758 (1979) Scolar Press, .
Sir William Chambers: Knight of the Polar Star (1970) with J. Mordaunt Crook and John Harris, Zwemmer, .
Furniture of Robert Adam (1963) Chapters in Art Series, Tiranti, .

Books - Exhibition Catalogues
Hooked on Books: The Library of Sir John Soane, Architect 1753-1837 (2004) edited with Nicholas Savage, Sir John Soane's Museum.

Articles 
Robert Adam on Park Avenue: The Interiors for Bolton House (1995) The Burlington Magazine, Vol 137, No 1103, February 1995, pp 68–75.
The Lansdowne House drawing room: reconstructing Adam - properly (1992) Apollo, No 366, 1992, pp 83–86.
Sir John Soane's Library: "O, Books! Ye Monuments of Mind" (1990) Apollo, No 338, April 1990, part of pp 224–251.
John Wood's system of architecture (1989) The Burlington Magazine, No 1031, 1989, p 101.
"Vitruvius Britannicus" before Colin Campbell (1986) The Burlington Magazine, Vol 128, No 998, May 1986, pp 340–346.
Burke and Chambers on the Sublime and Beautiful (1967) Essays in the History of Architecture Presented to Rudolf Wittkower on his 65th birthday, edited by Douglas Fraser, Howard Hibbard and Milton J Lewine, Phaidon, London, pp 207–13.

References

External links 
Sir John Soane's Museum
Country Life magazine, David Watkin's review of The Country Houses of Robert Adam, 1 November 2007

1932 births
Living people
English architectural historians
People from Brooklyn
People from Badminton, Gloucestershire